Joe Williams (born May 12, 1942) is a former American football defensive end who played two seasons in the Canadian Football League with the Montreal Alouettes and Toronto Argonauts. He played college football at Maryland State College.

References

External links
Just Sports Stats

Living people
1942 births
Players of American football from Philadelphia
Players of Canadian football from Philadelphia
American football defensive ends
Canadian football defensive linemen
American players of Canadian football
Maryland Eastern Shore Hawks football players
Montreal Alouettes players
Toronto Argonauts players